Seok-ju, also spelled Seok-joo or Sok-ju, is a Korean masculine given name. Its meaning differs based on the hanja used to write each syllable of the name. There are 20 hanja with the reading "seok" and 56 hanja with the reading "ju" on the South Korean government's official list of hanja which may be registered for use in given names.

People with this name include:
Kim Seok-ju (1634–1684), Joseon Dynasty Neo-Confucian scholar
Na Seok-ju (1892–1926), Korean independence activist who bombed the Oriental Development Company
Kang Sok-ju (born 1939), North Korean politician and diplomat
Ha Seok-ju (born 1968), South Korean football player

Fictional characters with this name include:
Kim Seok-joo, from 2014 South Korean television series A New Leaf

See also
List of Korean given names
Shin Suk-ju (신숙주; 1417–1475), Joseon Dynasty official and soldier

References

Korean masculine given names